Robert Gooding-Williams (born 1953) is M. Moran Weston/Black Alumni Council Professor of African-American Studies and Professor of Philosophy at Columbia University. He is the founding director of Columbia's Center for Race, Philosophy, and Social Justice.  He specializes in philosophy of race and Continental philosophy, especially Nietzsche.

Education and career

Gooding-Williams earned a B.A. (1975) and Ph.D. (1982) in philosophy from Yale University. He taught first at Amherst College, where he became professor of black studies and George Lyman Crosby 1896 professor of philosophy.  He became professor of philosophy at Northwestern University, where he taught for seven years and directed Northwestern's Alice Berline Kaplan Center for the Humanities. He joined the department of political science at the University of Chicago in 2006 and was named Ralph and Mary Otis Isham Professor in 2007.  He joined the Columbia faculty in 2014.

He was elected a Fellow of the American Academy of Arts and Sciences in 2018.

Books
 Zarathustra's Dionysian Modernism (Stanford University Press, 2001)
 Look, A Negro! Philosophical Essays on Race, Culture, and Politics (Routledge, 2005)
 In The Shadow of Du Bois: Afro-Modern Political Thought in America (Harvard University Press, 2009)

References

Living people
Columbia University faculty
Black studies scholars
Yale University alumni
Nietzsche scholars
1953 births